Limacus flavus, known commonly as the cellar slug, the yellow slug, or  the tawny garden slug, is a medium to large species of air-breathing land slug, a terrestrial pulmonate gastropod mollusk in the family Limacidae.

Description 
This slug has a yellow body with grey mottling, and pale blue tentacles. When extended, the body length can be .

Distribution 
The yellow slug is common in Scotland, England, Wales and Ireland as well as most of southern and western Europe. It has been accidentally introduced in many other parts of the world.
 Great Britain
 Ireland
 Ukraine
 China
 and other areas

Behavior 
Yellow slugs, like the majority of other land slugs, use two pairs of tentacles on their heads to sense their environment. The upper pair, called optical tentacles, is used to sense light. The lower pair, oral tentacles, provide the slug's sense of smell. Both pairs can retract and extend themselves to avoid hazards, and, if lost to an accident or predation, can be regrown.

Like all slugs, the yellow slug moves relatively slowly, gliding along using a series of muscular contractions on the underside of its foot, which is lubricated with mucus, such that it leaves a slime trail behind it.

Ecology 
This species feeds mostly on fungi, decaying matter, and vegetables.

Habitat 
This species is strongly associated with human habitation, and is usually found in damp areas such as cellars, kitchens, and gardens or under stones. Generally speaking it is only seen at night, because it is nocturnal. Thus often it goes unnoticed and people are unaware of how (relatively) common the species is.

Limacus flavus are inedible to humans. The slugs and other snails are researched and have been found to have a high count of fatty acid composition of phospholipids, including omega 6 and other important fatty acids.

Parasites 
Parasites of Limacus flavus include the nematode Angiostoma spiridonovi.

References 

 Spencer, H.G., Marshall, B.A. & Willan, R.C. (2009). Checklist of New Zealand living Mollusca. pp 196–219 in Gordon, D.P. (ed.) New Zealand inventory of biodiversity. Volume one. Kingdom Animalia: Radiata, Lophotrochozoa, Deuterostomia. Canterbury University Press, Christchurch.
 Barker, G. M. (1999). Naturalised terrestrial Stylommatophora (Mollusca: Gastropoda). Fauna of New Zealand 38: 1-254
 Herbert, D.G. (2010). The introduced terrestrial Mollusca of South Africa. SANBI Biodiversity Series, 15: vi + 108 pp. Pretoria.
 Sysoev, A. V. & Schileyko, A. A. (2009). Land snails and slugs of Russia and adjacent countries. Sofia/Moskva (Pensoft). 312 pp., 142 plates. [June] [= Pensoft Series Faunistica No 87] page(s): 151, Fig. 77D, 84F

External links 

 Limax flavus at Animalbase taxonomy, short description, distribution, biology, status (threats), images 
 Image of the Great Yellow Slug

Limacidae
Gastropods described in 1758
Taxa named by Carl Linnaeus